The American Chamber of Commerce in Sri Lanka represents a large number of Business, Trade, Information Technology and Investment related organizations which are engaged their activities in between Sri Lanka and the United States of America.

See also 
 Chamber of commerce
 Sri Lankan American
 United States Chamber of Commerce
 U.S. Women's Chamber of Commerce
 United States Commercial Service
 Ceylon Chamber of Commerce

External links 
 AmCham Sri Lanka Website
 United States Chamber of Commerce
 Business Civic Leadership Center
 Center for International Private Enterprise

American Chambers of commerce